A metroon (or ) was an ancient Greek temple dedicated to a mother goddess. They were often devoted to Cybele, Demeter, or Rhea.

Athens 
Coordinates: 

The Athenian Metroon was located on the west side of the city's Agora, in the Old Bouleuterion, which formerly housed the city council. At the end of the 5th century BC, the New Bouleuterion was built and the council's former home converted into a temple to Cybele. Supposedly, the Athenians had killed one of her wandering priests when he attempted to introduce her cult; the plague which then visited the city was dealt with by honoring her. (The account may, however, have been a later invention, as the earliest source is from the 4th century AD.) The Metroon continued to serve a public function, housing the official archives of the city.

Olympia
The Olympian Metroon was erected in the late 4th or early 3rd century BC, immediately below the terrace which housed the Treasuries.

See also
 Ancient Greek religion

References

External links

Ancient Greek buildings and structures
Greek temples
Temples in ancient Athens
Temples of Demeter
Temples of Cybele